A piscivore is a carnivorous animal that eats primarily fish. The name piscivore is derived . Piscivore is equivalent to the Greek-derived word ichthyophage, both of which mean "fish eater". Fish were the diet of early tetrapod evolution (via water-bound amphibians during the Devonian period); insectivory came next; then in time, the more terrestrially adapted reptiles and synapsids evolved herbivory.

Almost all predatory fishes (most sharks, tuna, billfishes, pikes etc.) are obligated piscivores. Some non-piscine aquatic animals, such as whales, sea lion and crocodilians, are not completely piscivorous, often also preying on invertebrates, marine mammals, waterbirds and even wading land animals in addition to fish; while others, such as the bulldog bat and gharial, are strictly dependent on fish for food. Some creatures, including cnidarians, octopuses, squid, spiders, cetaceans, grizzly bears, jaguars, wolves, snakes, turtles and sea gulls, may have fish as significant if not dominant portions of their diets. Humans can live on fish-based diets, as can their carnivorous domesticated pets such as dogs and cats.

The ecological effects of piscivores can extend to other food chains.  In a study of cutthroat trout stocking, researchers found that the addition of this piscivore can have noticeable effects on non-aquatic organisms, in this case bats feeding on insects emerging from the water with the trout. 
Another study done on lionfish removal to maintain low densities use piscivore densities as a biological indicator for coral reef success.

There exists classifications of primary and secondary piscivores. Primary piscivores, also known as "specialists", shift to this habit in the first few months of their lives. Secondary piscivores will move to eating primarily fish later in their lifetime. It is hypothesized that the secondary piscivores' diet change is due to an adaptation to maintain efficiency in their use of energy while growing.

Examples of extant piscivores
 Aquatic genet
 Yellow anaconda
 Komodo dragon
 Green anaconda
 Flat-headed cat
 Bulldog bat
 Sea lion
 Fur seal
 Orca
 Silver arowana
 Otter shrew
 European otter
 North American river otter
 American mink
 Fishing cat
 Amazon river dolphin
 Giant otter
 Bottlenose dolphin
 Harbor seal
 Osprey
 Merganser
 Penguin
 Bald eagle
 Arapaima
 Fish-eating bat
 Gharial
 Yellow-bellied sea snake
 African tigerfish
 Barracuda
 Giant trevally
 Alligator gar
 Asian water monitor
 Lemon shark
 Fishing spider
 Tiger
 Piranha
 Bluefish
 Lionfish
Kidako moray

Extinct and prehistoric piscivores
Numerous extinct and prehistoric animals are hypothesized to have been primarily piscivorous due to anatomy and/or ecology. Furthermore, some have been confirmed to be piscivorous through fossil evidence.  This list includes specialist piscivores, such as Laganosuchus, as well as generalist predators, such as Baryonyx & Spinosaurus, found to have or assumed to have eaten fish.
 
Baryonyx (an opportunistic predator that had a crocodile-like skull, and scales of the lepidotid fish Scheenstia have been found in a skeleton where the stomach should be)
Spinosaurus (close relative of Baryonyx, is hypothesized to have preyed on fish because of giant coelacanthids found in the same environment, and due to anatomical features, including a pressure-sensitive snout that could have detected movements of swimming prey)
Laganosuchus (flattened head suggests that it passively waited for fish to swim near its mouth in order to engulf them)
Pteranodon (remains of fish found in the beaks and stomach cavities of some specimens)
Elasmosaurus (long neck, stereoscopicly positioned eyes, and long teeth are thought to be adaptations for stalking and trapping fish and other schooling animals) 
Thyrsocles  (fossil specimen found with the stomach stuffed with the extinct herring Xyne grex)
Xiphactinus (a 4-meter-long specimen was found with a perfectly preserved skeleton of its relative, Gillicus, in its stomach)
Diplomystus (a small relative of the herring, numerous fossils of individuals that died while trying to swallow other fishes, including smaller individuals of the same species, are known)
Ornithocheirus (hypothesized to be piscivorous due to anatomy of its jaws and dentition)
Titanoboa (multiple cranial and biochemical characteristics suggest it was primarily piscivorous)

References

Carnivory
Animals by eating behaviors